The Do Meio River is a river of Rio de Janeiro state in southeastern Brazil.  It is a tributary of the Macabu River.

See also
List of rivers of Rio de Janeiro

References
Brazilian Ministry of Transport

Rivers of Rio de Janeiro (state)